Booty Call is a 1997 American comedy film.

Booty Call may also refer to:

 Booty call, a slang term for a request for casual sex
 Booty Call (EP), by the Midnight Beast, 2010
 Booty Call (soundtrack), the film's 1997 soundtrack

Other uses
 "Booti Call", a 1994 song by Blackstreet
 "Bootie Call", a 1998 song by All Saints
 Jake's Booty Call, a series of Flash animation games and the 2003 movie based on the series

See also

 Pocket dialing or "butt dialing", a type of accidental phone call 
 Bootie (disambiguation)
 Booty (disambiguation)
 Mating call (disambiguation)